This was the first edition of the tournament.

Madison Brengle and Claire Liu won the title, defeating Vitalia Diatchenko and Oksana Kalashnikova 6–4, 6–3 in the final.

Seeds

Draw

Draw

References

External links
Main Draw

Veneto Open - Doubles